The reddish speckled dart (Cerastis tenebrifera) is a moth of the family Noctuidae. It is found from Newfoundland to South Carolina, west to Texas, north to Nebraska and southern Ontario.

The wingspan is 30–40 mm. Adults are on wing from March to June.

Larvae have been reared on Lactuca, Vitis, Taraxacum officinale, Rubus idaeus, Salix petiolaris, Prunus virginiana, Betula papyrifera and Vaccinium myrtilloides.

External links
Bug Guide
Images
The Noctuinae (Lepidoptera: Noctuidae) of Great Smoky Mountains National Park, U.S.A.

Noctuinae
Moths of North America